Curt Close is a Belgian singer-songwriter, producer, and documentary filmmaker.

Biography
At the age of ten, Close began to play the piano by ear instead of taking lessons. He composed his first song at the age of fourteen and began to perform at small school concerts. When he was nineteen, he met Pierre Rapsat, a composer and performer who became his mentor and friend and with whom he would write several songs. Later on, an advertisement led to a meeting with Nicolas Varak, a producer in Paris who signed him up with East West (Warner Music France) for his first album, Le vent se lève. The recording took place in Paris and Los Angeles, and various musicians contributed to the album, including Jean Mora on keyboards, Emmanuel Vergeade on guitar, Denis Benarrosch on percussion, Marc Berthoumieux on accordion, Didier Dessers writing for strings, Abraham Laboriel Sr (Michael Jackson, Elton John) on bass, Abe Laboriel Jr. (Sting, Paul McCartney, Johnny Hallyday, Mylène Farmer) on drums, and Brad Cole (Phil Collins) on piano and keyboards. Le vent se lève was released in September 2001.

In 2005, Close played the role of Merlin in Catherine Lara's musical comedy Graal, and he contributed vocals to the recording of the show, which was released the same year.

In 2007, Close formed the band Enfantsonic with Londoners Jonny & Archie Dyke.

Since 2013, Close has been directing and producing documentary films. In 2014, he directed the film The Greenhouse of the Future, which deals with food self-sufficiency.

Discography
 Le vent se lève (2001)
 Enfantsonic (2009)

References

1975 births
Living people
21st-century Belgian male singers
21st-century Belgian singers